The 2016 Women's Hockey Under-21 Invitational Tournament was an invitational women's under-21 field hockey competition, hosted by Real Federación Española de Hockey. The tournament took place between 24 and 30 October 2016 in Valencia, Spain. A total of five teams competed for the title.

Spain won the tournament, finishing top of the pool after the round-robin stage.

Teams
Including Spain, 5 teams were invited by the Real Federación Española de Hockey to participate in the tournament.

 
 
 
 
  (host nation)

Officials
The following umpires were appointed by the International Hockey Federation to officiate the tournament:

 Anne van den Bosch (BEL)
 Gema Calderón (ESP)
 Angelika Koppen (GER)
 Ivona Makar (CRO)
 Ayanna McClean (TTO)
 Rama Potnis (IND)
 Emma Shelbourn (ENG)

Results
All times are local, Central European Time (UTC+01:00).

Pool

Fixtures

References

External links
International Hockey Federation

Hockey Under–21 Invitational Tournament
Hockey Under–21 Invitational Tournament
International women's field hockey competitions hosted by Spain
Hockey Under–21 Invitational Tournament